Maelsechlainn mac Tadhg Mor

The Annals of the Four Masters record Maelsechlainn with this terse entry: "Maelseachlainn, son of Tadhg, son of Maelruanaidh, lord of Magh-Luirg, was slain by the men of Breifne and Tighearnan Ua Ruairc."

References
 "Mac Dermot of Moylurg: The Story of a Connacht Family", Dermot Mac Dermot, 1996.
 http://www.macdermot.com/

1124 deaths
Kings of Connacht
12th-century Irish monarchs
People from County Roscommon
MacDermot family
Year of birth unknown